The Fourth Reich is a hypothetical Nazi Reich that is the successor to Adolf Hitler's Third Reich (1933–1945). The term has also been used to refer to the possible resurgence of Nazi ideas, as well as pejoratively of political opponents.

Origin 
The term "Third Reich" was coined by Arthur Moeller van den Bruck in his 1923 book Das Dritte Reich. He defined the Holy Roman Empire (800–1806) as the "First Reich", the German Empire (18711918) as the "Second Reich",  while the "Third Reich" was a postulated ideal state including all German people, including Austria. In the modern context, the term refers to Nazi Germany. It was used by the Nazis to legitimize their regime as a successor state to the retroactively-renamed First and Second Reichs.

The term "Fourth Reich" has been used in a variety of different ways. Neo-Nazis have used it to describe their envisioned revival of an ethnically pure state, mostly in reference to, but not limited to, Nazi Germany. Others have used the term derogatorily, such as conspiracy theorists like Max Spiers, Peter Levenda, and Jim Marrs who have used it to refer to what they perceive as a covert continuation of Nazi ideals.

Neo-Nazism

Neo-Nazis envision the Fourth Reich as featuring Aryan supremacy, anti-Semitism, Lebensraum, aggressive militarism and totalitarianism. Upon the establishment of the Fourth Reich, German neo-Nazis propose that Germany should acquire nuclear weapons and use the threat of their use as a form of nuclear blackmail to re-expand to Germany's former boundaries as of 1937.

Based on pamphlets published by David Myatt in the early 1990s, many neo-Nazis came to believe that the rise of the Fourth Reich in Germany would pave the way for the establishment of the Western Imperium, a pan-Aryan world empire encompassing all land populated by predominantly European-descended peoples (i.e., Europe, Russia, Anglo-America, Australia, New Zealand, and White South Africa).

Usage to indicate German influence in the European Union
Some commentators in Europe have used the term "Fourth Reich" to point at the influence that they believe Germany exerts within the European Union. For example, Simon Heffer wrote in the Daily Mail that Germany's economic power, further boosted by the European financial crisis, is the "economic colonisation of Europe by stealth", whereby Berlin is using economic pressure rather than armies to "topple the leadership of a European nation". This, he says, constitutes the "rise of the Fourth Reich." Likewise, Simon Jenkins of The Guardian wrote that it is "a massive irony that old Europe's last gasp should be to seek ... German supremacy". According to Richard J. Evans of the New Statesman, this kind of language had not been heard since German reunification which sparked a wave of Germanophobic commentary. In a counterbalancing perspective, the "Charlemagne" columnist at The Economist reports that the German hegemony perspective does not match reality.

In August 2012, the Italian newspaper Il Giornale had as headline the phrase "Fourth Reich" (Quarto Reich) as a protest against German hegemony.

This perspective gained particular traction in the United Kingdom in the run up to 2016 EU referendum and the subsequent negotiations.

In December 2021, against the background of the 2015–present Polish constitutional crisis, Jarosław Kaczyński, Polish deputy Prime Minister and head of Poland's ruling party, told the  far-right Polish newspaper GPC that "Germany is trying to turn the EU into a federal 'German fourth Reich'". He explained that he was referring to the connection with the first Reich (the Holy Roman Empire), not the third one (Nazi Germany), and there was nothing negative about the comparison. But he criticized the vision of greater federalism, as displayed by Olaf Scholz and his coalition, as "utopian and therefore dangerous". Kaczynski remarked that, "if we Poles agreed to such a modern submission we would be degraded in many ways".

Usage to describe the rise of right-wing populism
The term has come to be used by commentators on the left, seeing the rise of right-wing populism as akin to the emergence of fascism in Europe in the 1920s and 1930s. In a 1973 interview, black American writer James Baldwin said of Richard Nixon's reelection, "To keep the nigger in his place, they brought into office law and order, but I call it the Fourth Reich." In 2019, a professor of history at Fairfield University named Gavriel D. Rosenfeld remarked that "Too many hyperbolic comparisonsfor example, between Donald Trump and Adolf Hitlerdulls the power of historical analogies and risks crying wolf. Too little willingness to see past dangers lurking in the present risks underestimating the latter and ignoring the former."

References in popular culture

Film
In the film Iron Sky in 1945 some Nazis escaped to the far side of the Moon and established the Fourth Reich.

Television
In the TV series Hunters, some Nazi leaders escaped to South America and plan to establish the Fourth Reich via Nazis brought to the United States by Operation Paperclip. It's revealed that Hitler and Eva Braun are still alive, however Braun appears to be leading the remaining Nazis rather than Hitler.

Novels
The 1978 Robert Ludlum novel The Holcroft Covenant involves the discovery of a plot by hidden Nazis around the world to create a Fourth Reich by infiltrating many different businesses and countries' governments. His 1995 novel The Apocalypse Watch reaches its climax with the destruction of a Fourth Reich set in the 1990s, and the discovery of an ancient Adolf Hitler controlling a massive multinational corporation.

Comics
In the British comic 2000 AD a storyline called The Shicklgruber Grab from Strontium Dog mutant bounty hunters Johnny Alpha and Wulf Sternhammer are hired to go back to 1945 and bring Hitler to the future to stand trial. Hitler, who murdered Eva Braun shortly after marrying her, and used his simpleton body double to fake his suicide so he could escape and start the Fourth Reich, however he gets dragged to the future not understanding what is going on.

Video games
At the end of Call of Duty: Vanguard, some Nazis try to escape the falling Nazi Germany to establish the Fourth Reich elsewhere.

See also

References

Bibliography
 
 
 
 Schultz, Sigrid. Germany Will Try It Again (Reynal & Hitchcock, New York, 1944)
 
 

Anti-German sentiment
Conspiracy theories in Germany
Euroscepticism
Far-right politics in Germany
Nazi analogies
Neo-Nazi concepts
Political terminology in Germany
Proposed countries